Melissa Sweet (born January 1, 1956) is an American illustrator and writer of children's books. She has won several awards for her illustrations, most notably a Caldecott Honor in 2009 for A River of Words and in 2015 for The Right Word, both by Jen Bryant. Sweet is represented by Rebecca Sherman at Writers House.

Personal life 
Sweet was born in Wyckoff, New Jersey and studied at Kansas City Art Institute. She lives with her husband and dog, Ruby, in Rockport, Maine.

Career 
Sweet began her career in book illustration with James Howe’s Pinky and Rex series. She has since illustrated nearly 100 books; several of these she authored and for many more she collaborated with other writers. She illustrated three books for author Jen Bryant including, A River of Words, A Splash of Red, and The Right Word.

Sweet conducts extensive research on the subjects of her biographies for children, which she illustrates with watercolor, mixed media, and collage. In her books she said in an interview that she "likes to use every color on the color wheel..." and also that she's "...very big on complementary colors.". In the same interview she says that she took a color theory class, and she did not know how to mix colors, and as a result, used colors "...straight from the tube..." and in response, she said her teacher "...threw out 90 percent of my art supplies. He gave me this limited palette and showed me how to mix colors". Later in this same interview she revealed that watercolor is her favorite medium to illustrate with. She also said in this same interview that she was inspired to start writing and illustrating children's book by Maurice Sendak's Little Bear series, which she said gave her the confidence to believe that she could illustrate children's books.

In Balloons over Broadway  Sweet describes her work process as "To create the art for the book, I began by making toys and puppets. I played with all sorts of materials, not knowing exactly what the outcomes would be.In addition to the watercolor illustrations, my collages are, in part, a mix of paper from old books to make papermache puppets, found objects, and fabrics, all painted or altered to illustrate what it may have felt like to be in Sarg’s world. Some of the toys in my illustrations are based on ones from Tony’s vast collection, but the actual toys in this book are the ones I made. On a few of the pages I even used Tony’s illustrations from The Tony Sarg Marionette Book. I tried to keep in mind that in everything Sarg did,he conveyed the sense that he was having fun His legacy reminds me that “play” may be the most important element in making art!" 

Some Writer! The Story of E. B. White is a 176 page long biographical picture book that Sweet wrote and illustrated using watercolor and collage art. It includes excerpts from White's personal life, early drafts of his novels, family pictures, and other previously unpublished information on the writer. She received permission to use White's words from his grand-daughter and the chief executor of his will, Martha White. White not only gave Sweet her permission, she even offered to help by allowing her to have access to the family's personal records, memorabilia, and photo albums of E.B white.

Selected works

Author and illustrator
 Carmine: A Little More Red (2005) – New York Times Best Illustrated book
 Tupelo Rides the Rails (2008)
 Balloons Over Broadway: The True Story of the Puppeteer of Macy’s Parade (2011) – Sibert Medal winner (for informational books), Orbis Pictus Award (for nonfiction), Charlotte Zolotow Award Highly Commended Title 
 Some Writer! The Story of E. B. White (2016) – New York Times Best Seller, Orbis Pictus Award

Illustrator
 Girls Think of Everything: Stories of Ingenious Inventions by Women (2002) by Catherine Thimmish 
 Moonlight The Halloween Cat (2003) by Cynthia Rylant 
 The Boy Who Drew Birds:The Story of John James Audubon (2004) by Jacqueline Davies 
 A River of Words: The Story of William Carlos Williams (2008) by Jen Bryant – Caldecott Honor (2009)
 The Sleepy Little Alphabet: A Bedtime Story from Alphabet Town(2009) by Judy Sierra 
 Spike, the Mixed Up Monster (2012) by Susan Hood 
 A Splash of Red: The Life and Art of Horace Pippin (2013) by Jen Bryant – Schneider Family Book Award
 The Right Word: Roget and His Thesaurus (2014) by Jen Bryant – Caldecott Honor (2015), Kirkus Prize finalist (Young Readers)
 Little Red Writing (2013) by Joan Hoab – School Library Journal Best Books of the Year (2013), Kirkus Reviews Best Children's Books of the Year, Kirkus Reviews Best Children's Books of 2013
 Brave Girl: Clara and the Shirtwaist Maker's Strike (2013) by Michelle Markel
 Day is Done (2014) by Peter Yarrow
 Firefly July: A Year of Very Short Poems (2014) by Paul B. Janeczko 
 You Nest Here With Me (2015) by Jane Yolen & Heidi Stemple 
 Listen to Our World (2016) by Bill Martin Jr. & Michael Sampson 
 How To Read A Book (2019) by Kwame Alexander

References

External links 

 

American children's book illustrators
American women artists
1956 births
People from Wyckoff, New Jersey
Living people
People from Rockport, Maine
Kansas City Art Institute alumni
Robert F. Sibert Informational Book Medal winners